Minnesota State Highway 249 was a highway in southeast Minnesota, which ran from its intersection with State Highways 44 and 76 in Caledonia and continued east to its eastern terminus at its intersection with State Highway 26 in Crooked Creek Township, south of Reno.  

The route was a state marked route from 1949 to 1992. In the present day, nearly all of the route is known as Houston County Road 249.

The highway was also known as Main Street, Winnebago Street, and Adams Street in the city of Caledonia.

Route description
Highway 249 had passed through the communities of Caledonia, Mayville Township, and Crooked Creek Township.

The highway was legally defined as Legislative Route 249 in the Minnesota Statutes § 161.115(180).

The roadway is unpaved from its intersection with Highway 26 to its intersection with Houston County Road 24.

History
Highway 249 was authorized on July 1, 1949 and removed in 1989. Most of the road became County Road 249, except for two segments in Caledonia which became extensions of County Road 3 and County Road 5.

Major intersections

References

249